Piergiorgio Farina (25 April 1933 – 28 July 2008) was an Italian jazz violinist, composer and singer.

Career 
Born Piergiorgio Farinelli in Goro, Ferrara, Farina was the cousin of the singer Milva. He started his career performing in Emilia-Romagna's ballrooms, and had his breakout in the second half of the 1960s thanks to his participation to the RAI musical variety Settevoci.

In 1968 he entered the competition at the Sanremo Music Festival in couple with Orietta Berti with the song ″Tu che non sorridi mai″, while in the 1975 edition of the Festival he was cast to perform on violin all the competing songs. He was also a sax, double bass and piano musician.

His son Bruno is also a musician.

Discography 
Albums 
     1971: Piergiorgio Farina – Piccolo Cabotaggio
1974: Il violino d'amore di Piergiorgio Farina 
     1975: Violino d'amore  
     1977: Tempo di rock
1977: Piergiorgio Farina
     1978: ...a tutto rock!!!  
     1979: Trasloco  
1981: Amore
1982: Musica
1983: Immagina che .....
1985: Uno Strumento In Primo Piano: Violino
1985: Diario
     1986: Gran gala  
     1988: Dolci ricordi  
1988: Un' Orchestra Per La Radio 2
     1989: Napoli appassionata  
     1990: Tango  
     1991: Classic  
1996: Balliamo Con Il Violino Di Piergiorgio Farina
(Unknown): I Miei Successi

References

External links 

 

 Piergiorgio Farina at Discogs
 

1933 births
2008 deaths
Italian composers
People from the Province of Ferrara
20th-century Italian male singers
Italian jazz singers
Italian pop singers
Italian violinists
Male violinists
Jazz violinists
20th-century violinists
Male jazz musicians